Kim Jong-min is a Korean name.
Relevant people of this name are:

Kim Jong-min (born 1979): a South Korean singer.
Kim Jong-min (producer), a South Korean producer who also most producing animated shows The Haunted House (anime) and PaPa Dog

Kim Jong-min (footballer, born 1947), North Korean footballer
Kim Jong-min (born 1988), stage name Go Yoon, South Korean actor
Kim Jong-min (field hockey) (born 1980), South Korean Olympic hockey player
Kim Jong-min (footballer, born 1965): Played for FC Seoul
Kim Jong-min (volleyballer, born 1974): retired volleyball player, manager of Korean V-League Club Gimcheon Korea Expressway Corporation Hi-pass
Kim Jong-min (footballer, born 1992): Played for Suwon Samsung Bluewings
Kim Jong-min (footballer, born 1993): Played for Busan IPark
Kim Jong-min (politician, born 1964): a South Korean politician and lawmaker